Intelsat 905 (or IS-905) is a communications satellite operated by Intelsat.

Launch 
Intelsat 905 was launched by an Ariane 4 rocket from Guiana Space Centre, French Guiana, at 06:44 UTC on June 5, 2002.

Capacity and coverage 
It will provide voice, video, and internet services to all countries adjoining the Atlantic Ocean through its 72 C band and 22 Ku band transponders after parking over 24.5 degrees west longitude.

See also 
 2002 in spaceflight

External links 
 . Intelsat

References 

Intelsat satellites